The Crimson Candle is a 1934 British crime film directed by Bernard Mainwaring and starring Eve Gray, Eliot Makeham and Kenneth Kove. It was shot at Wembley Studios as a quota quickie for distribution by Metro-Goldwyn-Mayer.

Plot
A doctor attempts to prove that a maid is a murderer.

Cast
 Eve Gray as Mavis
 Eliot Makeham as Doctor Gaunt
 Kenneth Kove as Honorable Horatius Chillingsbotham
 Derek Williams as Leonard Duberley
 Kynaston Reeves as Inspector Blunt
 Eugene Leahy as Detective
  Audrey Cameron as Maid
  Arthur Goullet

References

Bibliography
 Chibnall, Steve. Quota Quickies: The Birth of the British 'B' Film. British Film Institute, 2007.
 Low, Rachael. Filmmaking in 1930s Britain. George Allen & Unwin, 1985.
 Wood, Linda. British Films, 1927-1939. British Film Institute, 1986.

External links

1934 films
1934 crime films
1930s English-language films
Films directed by Bernard Mainwaring
Metro-Goldwyn-Mayer films
British black-and-white films
British crime films
1930s British films
Quota quickies
Films shot at Wembley Studios